"The Width of a Circle" is a song written by English musician David Bowie in 1969 for the album The Man Who Sold the World, recorded in spring 1970 and released later that year in the United States and in April 1971 in the UK. The opening track on the album, it is a hard rock song with heavy metal overtones. Bowie had performed a shorter version of the song in concerts for several months before recording it.

Featuring Mick Ronson's lead guitar work and occasional choral effects from the band, this 8-minute song is divided into two parts. The music takes on a heavy R&B quality in the second half, where the narrator enjoys a sexual encounter – with God, the Devil or some other supernatural being, according to different interpretations – in the depths of Hell.

Some sources claim that the song was released as a single by RCA in Eastern Europe, with "Cygnet Committee" from Bowie's 1969 album Space Oddity on the B-side. However, this 'Russian' single was pressed by a fan and therefore is unofficial.

Live versions
Several live versions of the song have been released:
A 10-minute, 43-second version recorded at Santa Monica Civic Auditorium on 20 October 1972 has been released on Santa Monica '72 and Live Santa Monica '72.
A 9-minute edited version recorded at the Hammersmith Odeon, London, on 3 July 1973 was released on Ziggy Stardust – The Motion Picture in 1983, the complete 16-minute performance being issued on the 30th Anniversary 2CD Special Edition in 2003. The additional length, featuring an extended instrumental break by Mick Ronson and the band, allowed for Bowie's costume change, a common occurrence during the Ziggy Stardust tours.
A version from Bowie's 1974 North American tour was released on David Live in 1974.
A version recorded with the Tony Visconti Trio (also known as The Hype) on The Sunday Show on 5 February 1970, introduced by John Peel, was released on Bowie at the Beeb in 2000.

Other releases
The song appeared on the Japanese compilation The Best of David Bowie in 1974.

The box set The Width of a Circle, released posthumously in 2021, features an early recording of the song from The Sounds of the 70s: Andy Ferris.

Cover versions
Spurge – Crash Course for the Ravers – A Tribute to the Songs of David Bowie (1996)
The Spiders from Mars – The Mick Ronson Memorial Concert (2001); the Spiders here consisting of Joe Elliott (vocals, acoustic guitar), Trevor Bolder (bass), Woody Woodmansey, (drums), Billy Rankin (guitar), and Nicky Graham (piano)

Personnel
David Bowie: lead vocals, acoustic guitar
Mick Ronson: electric guitar, backing vocals
Tony Visconti: bass, backing vocals
Woody Woodmansey: drums

Notes

References
Pegg, Nicholas, The Complete David Bowie, Reynolds & Hearn Ltd, 2000, 

David Bowie songs
1970 songs
1973 singles
Songs written by David Bowie
Song recordings produced by Tony Visconti
Mercury Records singles
LGBT-related songs